William Alfred Smith (29 September 1900 – 6 January 1990) was an English cricketer. Smith was a right-handed batsman who bowled right-arm fast-medium. He was born at Corsham, Wiltshire.

Smith made his debut in county cricket for Wiltshire in the 1929 Minor Counties Championship against the Surrey Second XI. From 1929 to 1939, Smith made 89 appearances for Wiltshire in the Minor Counties Championship, the last of which came against Dorset. In his career with Wiltshire he took 387 wickets at an average of 16.84. In 1935, Smith made his first-class debut for a combined Minor Counties team against the touring South Africans at Richmond Drive, Skegness. Batting first, the South Africans made 394 all out, with Smith taking the wickets of Eric Rowan and Dudley Nourse, finishing with figures of 2/97 from 28 overs. Responding in their first-innings, the Minor Counties made 190 all out, during which Smith, who batted at number eleven, ended the innings not out on 7. Forced to follow-on in their second-innings, the Minor Counties made 224 all out, with Smith the last man out when he was dismissed for a single run by Arthur Langton. The South Africans reached their target in their second-innings for the loss of two wickets, with Smith taking both wickets to fall, those of Langton and Robert Williams, with figures of 2/10 from two overs. The following season he made a second and final first-class appearance for the Minor Counties against Oxford University at the University Parks. Batting first, the Minor Counties made 251 all out, with Smith the last man out when he was dismissed for 35 runs by Tristan Ballance. In response, Oxford University made 288 all out in their first-innings, with Smith playing a major part with the ball, taking five wickets to finish with figures of 5/95 from 35 overs. In their second-innings, the Minor Counties made 294 all out, with Smith again the last man out, this time dismissed for 4 runs, with Ballance again taking his wicket. Oxford University reached 23 without loss in their second-innings, with the match declared a draw.

He died at Trowbridge, Wiltshire, on 6 January 1990. His younger brother, Jim, played Test cricket for England.

References

External links
William Smith at ESPNcricinfo
William Smith at CricketArchive

1900 births
1990 deaths
People from Corsham
English cricketers
Wiltshire cricketers
Minor Counties cricketers